Enigmatocolus is a genus of sea snails, marine gastropod mollusks in the family Buccinidae, the true whelks.

Species
Species within the genus Engoniophos include:
 Enigmaticolus auzendei (Warén & Bouchet, 2001)
 Enigmaticolus desbruyeresi (Okutani & Ohta, 1993)
 Enigmaticolus marshalli Fraussen & Stahlschmidt, 2016
 Enigmaticolus nipponensis (Okutani & Fujiwara, 2000)
 Enigmaticolus voluptarius Fraussen & Stahlschmidt, 2016
Synonyms
 Enigmaticolus inflatus S.-Q. Zhang, S.-P. Zhang & H. Chen, 2020: synonym of Enigmaticolus nipponensis (Okutani & Fujiwara, 2000)
 Enigmaticolus monnieri Fraussen, 2008: synonym of Enigmaticolus nipponensis (Okutani & Fujiwara, 2000)

References

Buccinidae